Hoto may refer to:

Head of the Ohio, a rowing race in Pittsburgh, Pennsylvania
 Hōtō, a noodle soup and regional dish originating from Yamanashi, Japan
 Hōtō (pagoda), a form of Japanese pagoda
 HOTO Tower, a business building in Zagreb, Croatia
 Cocoa Hoto, the main character of the manga series Is the Order a Rabbit?